Natasha Katz is an American lighting designer for the theatre, dance, and opera.

Biography

Early life and education
A New York City native, Katz trained at Oberlin College, and early in her career was mentored by Roger Morgan, a lighting designer and theatre consultant. Her first Broadway production was as lighting designer for the play Pack of Lies in 1985.

Career
Katz was nominated for a 2017 Tony Award for Hello, Dolly! and a 2017 Olivier Award for The Glass Menagerie. She won the 2016 Tony Award for Best Lighting Design of a Play for her work on Long Day’s Journey Into Night. She has 6 Tony Awards (3 plays, 3 musicals), with 14 nominations.
 
Among her over 60 Broadway credits include designs for Frozen, Springsteen on Broadway, Meteor Shower, Cats, School of Rock, Gigi, Skylight, An American in Paris (2015 Tony Award), Aladdin, The Glass Menagerie (2014 Tony Award), Motown: The Musical, Once (2012 Tony Award), Follies, Sister Act, Elf, Collected Stories, The Addams Family, Hedda Gabler, The Little Mermaid, The Coast of Utopia: Salvage (2007 Tony Award), A Chorus Line (revival), Tarzan, The 25th Annual Putnam County Spelling Bee, Sweet Smell of Success, Aida (2000 Tony Award), Twelfth Night, Beauty and the Beast, and Gypsy.  
 
She has lit the performances of Bette Midler, Zachary Quinto, Jake Gyllenhaal, Mike Tyson, Jessica Lange, Helen Hunt, Mary Louise Parker, Christopher Plummer, Elaine Stritch, Cathy Rigby, Nathan Lane, Bernadette Peters, Claudette Colbert and Sir Rex Harrison. She has also designed concert acts for Shirley MacLaine, Ann-Margret, Tommy Tune, and most recently Prince’s 2014 SNL appearance.
 
In the world of dance, Katz is a frequent collaborator with choreographer Christopher Wheeldon, with projects including Tryst, Alice's Adventures in Wonderland, and The Winter's Tale, all for The Royal Ballet in London. Other collaborations with Wheeldon include Continuum (San Francisco Ballet), Carnival of the Animals (New York City Ballet), An American in Paris (New York City Ballet, Théâtre du Châtelet, Broadway, London), Swan Lake (Pennsylvania Ballet), Cinderella (Dutch National Ballet), and The Nutcracker (Joffrey Ballet). Her other dance work includes American Ballet Theatre's production of Don Quixote and productions with companies including San Francisco Ballet, Dutch National Ballet, and National Ballet of Canada.
 
For the opera stage, her credits include Cyrano de Bergerac for the Metropolitan Opera, Die Soldaten for the New York City Opera, two productions of Norma for Dame Joan Sutherland: the Opera Pacific (in Costa Mesa, California) and the Michigan Opera Theatre (in Detroit). She worked with The Royal Opera on Cyrano de Bergerac, directed by Francesca Zambello.
 
Her film work includes Barrymore starring Christopher Plummer and Mike Tyson: The Undisputed Truth. She lit the HBO television specials Mambo Mouth and Spic-O-Rama starring John Leguizamo and scenes from two episodes of Girls shot inside the Belasco Theatre on 44th Street in New York City.
 
Her work may be seen in filmed performances of The Winter's Tale, Alice's Adventures in Wonderland and An American in Paris as well as the PBS documentary "Making a New Nutcracker" and the American Theatre Wing documentary Working in the Theatre: Lighting Design.
 
Her permanent audio-visual shows include The Masquerade Village at the Rio Casino, Las Vegas, the Big Bang at the Hayden Planetarium in New York, and the Niketown stores in New York City and London.
 
She is currently an Open Doors Mentor for the Theatre Development Fund.

Selected awards

|-
| 1994
| Beauty and the Beast
| Tony Award for Best Lighting Design
| 
|
|-
| 1995
| Beauty and the Beast
| Ovation Award for Best Lighting Design - Larger Theatre
| 
|
|-
| 1995
| Beauty and the Beast
| Los Angeles Drama Critics Circle Award for Distinguished Achievement in Lighting Design
| 
|
|-
| 1996
| Beauty and the Beast
| Dora Mavor Moore Award for Outstanding Lighting Design - Large Theatre Division
| 
|
|-
| 1998
| The Scarlet Pimpernel
| Outer Critics Circle Award
| 
|
|-
| 1999
| Twelfth Night
| Tony Award for Best Lighting Design
| 
|
|-
| 1999
| Twelfth Night
| Drama Desk Award for Outstanding Lighting Design
| 
|
|-
| 2000
| Aida
| Tony Award for Best Lighting Design
| 
|
|-
| 2000
| Aida
| Friends of New York Theatre Awards for Outstanding Lighting Design
| 
|
|-
| 2001
| Beauty and the Beast
| National Broadway Theatre Awards for Best Visual Presentation
| 
|
|-
| 2002
| Aida
| National Broadway Theatre Awards for Best Visual Presentation
| 
|
|-
| 2002
| Sweet Smell of Success: The Musical
| Tony Award for Best Lighting Design
| 
|
|-
| 2002
| Sweet Smell of Success: The Musical
| Drama Desk Award for Outstanding Lighting Design
| 
|
|-
| 2003
| Aida
| National Broadway Theatre Awards for Best Production Design
| 
|
|-
| 2006
|colspan=2| Ruth Morley Design Award for Outstanding Career in Lighting Design
| 
|
|-
| 2006
| Tarzan: The Musical
| Tony Award for Best Lighting Design of a Musical
| 
|
|-
| 2007
| The Coast of Utopia 
| Tony Award for Best Lighting Design of a Play
| 
| With Brian MacDevitt and Kenneth Posner
|-
| 2007
| The Coast of Utopia 
| Drama Desk Award for Outstanding Lighting Design
| 
| With Brian MacDevitt and Kenneth Posner
|-
| 2007
| The Coast of Utopia 
| Outer Critics Circle Award
| 
| With Brian MacDevitt and Kenneth Posner
|-
| 2008
| The Little Mermaid
| Tony Award for Best Lighting Design of a Musical
| 
|
|-
| 2008
| The Little Mermaid
| Drama Desk Award for Outstanding Lighting Design
| 
|
|-
| 2009
| Turn of the Century
| Jeff Award for Lighting Design - Large
| 
|
|-
| 2010
| Sister Act
| WhatsOnStage Awards for Best Lighting Design
| 
|
|-
| 2010
| The Addams Family
| Drama Desk Award for Outstanding Lighting Design
| 
|
|-
| 2011
| Sister Act
| Outer Critics Circle Award
| 
|
|-
| 2012
| The Iceman Cometh
| Jeff Award for Lighting Design - Large
| 
|
|-
| 2012
| Follies
| Tony Award for Best Lighting Design of a Musical
| 
|
|-
| 2012
| Once
| Tony Award for Best Lighting Design of a Musical
| 
|
|-
| 2012
| Once
| Lucille Lortel Awards
| 
|
|-
| 2014
| Aladdin
| Outer Critics Circle Award
| 
|
|-
| 2014
| The Glass Menagerie
| Tony Award for Best Lighting Design of a Play
| 
|
|-
| 2015
| Skylight
| Tony Award for Best Lighting Design of a Play
| 
|
|-
| 2015
| An American in Paris
| Tony Award for Best Lighting Design of a Musical
| 
|
|-
| 2015
| An American in Paris
| Outer Critics Circle Award
| 
|
|-
| 2015
| The Iceman Cometh
| Drama Desk Award for Outstanding Lighting Design
| 
|
|-
| 2016
| Long Day's Journey into Night
| Tony Award for Best Lighting Design of a Play
| 
|
|-
| 2016
| Long Day's Journey into Night
| Outer Critics Circle Award
| 
|
|-
| 2016
|colspan=2| Live Design - Design Achievement of the Year for Sustained Achievement in Theatrical Lighting Design
| 
|
|-
| 2017
| Aladdin
| WhatsOnStage Awards for Best Lighting Design
| 
|
|-
| 2017
| Hello, Dolly!
| Tony Award for Best Lighting Design of a Musical
| 
|
|-
| 2017
| Hello, Dolly!
| Outer Critics Circle Award
| 
|
|-
| 2017
| The Glass Menagerie
| Olivier Award for Best Lighting Design
| 
|
|-
| 2017
| An American in Paris
| BroadwayWorld UK Awards for Best Lighting Design of a New Production of a Play or Musical
| 
|
|-
| 2018
| An American in Paris
| WhatsOnStage Awards for Best Lighting Design
| 
|
|-
| 2018
| Aladdin
| Green Room Awards for the Music Theatre Award for Lighting Design
| 
|
|-
| 2018
|colspan=2| Sarah Applebaum Nederlander Award for Excellence in the Theatre "Apple Award"
| 
|Wayne State University
|-
|2022
|MJ
| Tony Award for Best Lighting Design of a Musical
| 
|
|-
|2022
|MJ
| Outer Critics Circle Award for Best Lighting Design (Play or Musical)
| 
|
|-
|2022
|MJ
|Drama Desk Award for Outstanding Lighting Design for a Musical
| 
|
|-
|2022
|Diana
|Drama Desk Award for Outstanding Lighting Design for a Musical
| 
|
|}

References

External links
 Natasha Katz official website

Biography at filmreference.com
American Theatre Wing's Working in the Theatre Episode on Lighting Design featuring Natasha Katz

American lighting designers
Tony Award winners
Oberlin College alumni
Year of birth missing (living people)
Living people
Ballet designers
Drama Desk Award winners